Jefferson L. Byrd (born June 16, 1971) is an American politician from New Mexico. He is a member of the New Mexico Public Regulation Commission from the 2nd district, which covers Chaves, Colfax, Curry, De Baca, Eddy, Guadalupe, Harding, Lea, Quay, Roosevelt, and Union Counties, and parts of Bernalillo, Lincoln, Mora, Otero, San Miguel, Santa Fe, and Torrance Counties.

Early life and education 
Byrd grew up on his family's ranch in Mosquero, New Mexico and attended Mosquero High School. He graduated from New Mexico State University in 1995 with a B.A. in agricultural engineering. He worked as an environmental engineer in the oil refining industry for fourteen years and owns two small businesses, including a ranch in Northern New Mexico.

Career 
A member of the Republican Party, Byrd ran for the U.S. House of Representatives in New Mexico's 3rd congressional district in 2012 and 2014, both times losing to incumbent Democratic Congressman Ben Ray Luján. In 2018, Byrd won the Republican nomination for Public Regulation Commissioner from the 2nd district over Jerry Partin, 54–46%. He defeated Democratic nominee Kevin Sanders 62-38% in the general election.

References

External links
 Jefferson Byrd – Ballotpedia profile
 New Mexico Public Regulation Commission – official site

1971 births
21st-century American politicians
Businesspeople from New Mexico
Environmental engineers
Living people
New Mexico Republicans
New Mexico State University alumni
People from Tucumcari, New Mexico
Ranchers from New Mexico
Candidates in the 2012 United States elections
Candidates in the 2014 United States elections